Pierre Engvall (born 31 May 1996) is a Swedish professional ice hockey player for the New York Islanders of the National Hockey League (NHL). Engvall was selected by the Toronto Maple Leafs in the seventh round (188th overall) of the 2014 NHL Entry Draft.

Playing career

Engvall made his Swedish Hockey League debut during the 2014–15 season appearing in 2 regular season games. On 8 May 2015, Engvall signed a contract with Mora IK of the HockeyAllsvenskan (Allsv). After a successful breakout season with Mora in the 2015–16 season, Engvall signed a contract extension to remain with the club.

Following the completion of his second full year with Mora IK, Engvall travelled to North America and agreed to sign an amateur try-out contract for the completion of the 2016–17 season with the Maple Leafs American Hockey League (AHL) affiliate, the Toronto Marlies on 12 April 2017. He appeared in one post-season game with the Marlies before opting to return to Sweden in signing a two-year contract with the reigning champions, HV71, in a return to the SHL on 7 May 2017.

In his first full SHL season in 2017–18, Engvall despite missing games to injury produced 20 points in just 31 appearances for HV71. After an early post-season exit, Engvall for a second consecutive year agreed to a try-out to join the Toronto Marlies for the remainder of their season on 21 March 2018. While in the midst of the Marlies playoff campaign, Engvall agreed to a two-year, entry-level contract with the Toronto Maple Leafs on 18 May 2018. He played his first game with the Leafs on 19 November 2019, in a 4–2 loss against the Vegas Golden Knights. Engvall scored his first NHL goal with the Leafs on 21 November 2019, a short-handed goal in a 3–1 road win against the Arizona Coyotes. Midway through his first season in the NHL, Engvall signed a two-year, $2.5 million extension with the Maple Leafs.

On 28 February 2023, the Maples Leafs traded Engvall to the New York Islanders in exchange for a third-round pick in the 2024 NHL Entry Draft.

Career statistics

Regular season and playoffs

International

Awards and honours

References

External links
 

1996 births
Living people
Frölunda HC players
HV71 players
IF Troja/Ljungby players
IK Oskarshamn players
Mora IK players
New York Islanders players
People from Ljungby Municipality
Sportspeople from Kronoberg County
Swedish expatriate ice hockey players in Canada
Swedish ice hockey forwards
Toronto Maple Leafs draft picks
Toronto Maple Leafs players
Toronto Marlies players